Heracleum may mean
The plant genus Heracleum (plant)
An alternative spelling of Herakleion, the capital of Crete in Greece
An alternative spelling of Heraklion, various places with that name
An alternative spelling of Heracleium, various places with that name

See also
Heracleium (disambiguation)
Heraklion (disambiguation)
Heracles